Ellis Ferreira and Jan Siemerink were the defending champions but lost in the quarterfinals to David Prinosil and Michael Stich.

Yevgeny Kafelnikov and Daniel Vacek won in the final 7–6, 6–4 against Menno Oosting and Pavel Vízner.

Seeds

  Jacco Eltingh /  Paul Haarhuis (first round)
  Yevgeny Kafelnikov /  Daniel Vacek (champions)
  Ellis Ferreira /  Jan Siemerink (quarterfinals)
  Libor Pimek /  Byron Talbot (quarterfinals)

Draw

External links
 1996 CA-TennisTrophy Doubles draw

Vienna Open
1996 ATP Tour